Arkovna Ridge is a narrow rocky ridge extending 45 km from the foothills of Madrid Dome to the southwest to Delusion Point to the east, 5.7 km wide, and rising to 1490 m (Ishirkov Crag) in northern Aristotle Mountains on Oscar II Coast in Graham Land. It surmounts Crane Glacier to the northwest and north, Spillane Fjord to the northeast, and Sexaginta Prista Bay, Mapple Glacier and the head of Melville Glacier to the south.  The feature is named after the settlement of Arkovna in Northeastern Bulgaria.

Location
British mapping in 1976.

Maps
 British Antarctic Territory.  Scale 1:200000 topographic map.  DOS 610 Series, Sheet W 65 62.  Directorate of Overseas Surveys, Tolworth, UK, 1976.
 Antarctic Digital Database (ADD). Scale 1:250000 topographic map of Antarctica. Scientific Committee on Antarctic Research (SCAR), 1993–2016.

References
 Arkovna Ridge. SCAR Composite Antarctic Gazetteer.
 Bulgarian Antarctic Gazetteer. Antarctic Place-names Commission. (details in Bulgarian, basic data in English)

External links
 Arkovna Ridge. Copernix satellite image

Ridges of Graham Land
Oscar II Coast
Bulgaria and the Antarctic